Boutlélis is a district in Oran Province, Algeria, on the Mediterranean Sea. It was named after its capital, Boutlélis.

Municipalities
The district is further divided into 3 municipalities:
Boutlélis
Aïn El Kerma
Misserghin

Districts of Oran Province